Frankston Park, known commercially as Kinetic Stadium, is a suburban Australian rules football ground located in Frankston, Victoria, in Australia. It is home to the Frankston Football Club, which plays in the Victorian Football League.

Frankston Park is noted for the unusually long and narrow dimensions of its playing surface. It is also a rare example of a top municipal football ground which has, for most of its history, not been used for cricket during the summer months; in the early 1920s, the council determined that it preferred to leave the ground as a public space during summer and to not compromise the surface by installing cricket pitches; since that time, Jubilee Park has been the district's primary cricket venue.

In 2008, the St Kilda Football Club had planned to move its primary training base from Moorabbin Oval to Frankston Park and to re-develop it into a top class training venue for the club; but these plans fell through due to high cost, and the club instead developed and moved to Belvedere Park in nearby Seaford.

Bryan Mace Grandstand
The grandstand at Frankston Park was the original grandstand from the first ever Australian Scout Jamboree in 1935, and was relocated to the ground shortly after. In 2005, Frankston City Council funded a A$1.2 million refurbishment of the grandstand. Following the latest refurbishment, it was renamed the "Bryan Mace Grandstand", in honour of the Frankston Football Club stalwart and general manager. The historic grandstand remained as a landmark at Frankston Park for 72 years, until it was destroyed by fire on 12 February 2008. The grandstand was subsequently reconstructed and completed in January 2011.

References

Victorian Football League grounds
Sports venues in Melbourne
Rugby league stadiums in Australia
Rugby union stadiums in Australia
Frankston, Victoria
Buildings and structures in the City of Frankston
Sport in the City of Frankston